Nineveh Governorate, also known as Ninawa Governorate, is a governorate in northern Iraq. Its largest city and provincial capital is Mosul, which lies across the Tigris river from the ruins of ancient Nineveh. Before 1976, it was called Mosul Province and included the present-day Dohuk Governorate. The second largest city is Tal Afar, which has an almost exclusively Turkmen population.

An ethnically, religiously and culturally diverse region, it was partly conquered by ISIS in 2014. Iraqi government forces retook the city of Mosul in 2017.

Recent history and administration 

Its two cities endured the 2003 U.S.-led invasion of Iraq and emerged unscathed. In 2004, however, Mosul and Tal Afar were the scenes of fierce battles between US-led troops and Iraqi insurgents. The insurgents moved to Nineveh after the Battle of Fallujah in 2004.

After the invasion, the military of the province was led by (then Major General) David Petraeus of the 101st Airborne Division and later by (then Brigadier General) Carter Ham as the multi-national brigade for Iraq. During the time, the American civil head of the local office of the Coalition Provisional Authority was US Foreign Service Officer and former Kurdish refugee to the States, Herro Mustafa. Mustafa administered her nominees on the provincial council and through members of the Kashmoula family.

In June 2004, Osama Kashmoula became the interim governor of the province and in September of the same year he was assassinated en route to Baghdad. He was succeeded as interim Governor by Duraid Kashmoula, who was elected governor in January 2005. Duraid Kashmoula resigned in 2009. In April 2009, Atheel al-Nujaifi, a hardline Arab nationalist and member of Al-Hadba, became governor. While al-Nujaifi's Arab Muttahidoon bloc lost its majority to the Kurdish Brotherhood and Coexistence Alliance List in the 2013 provincial election, al-Nujaifi was reelected as governor by a larger Sunni Arab coalition that was later formalized as the Nahda Bloc.

In June 2014, insurgents from the Islamic State of Iraq and the Levant (known as ISIS or ISIL) overran the capital Mosul, forcing an estimated 500,000 refugees to flee the area, including governor al-Nujaifi, who was subsequently deposed by the Iraqi Parliament.

While the Kurdish list proposed Hassan al-Allaf, an Arab affiliated with the Islamic Party, the provincial council elected Nofal Hammadi (formerly Loyalty to Nineveh List) with the votes of the Nahdha bloc.

An offensive to retake Mosul from ISIL control began in October 2016, with Iraqi and Kurdish soldiers supported by a U.S.-led coalition of 60 nations.

Provincial elections

Geography

Borders 
The province borders the governorates of Dohuk, Kirkuk, Erbil, Saladin, and Anbar. It also shares a border with Syria, mostly Al-Hasakah Governorate, and Deir ez-Zor Governorate.

Districts 
Nineveh Governorate comprises 9 districts, listed below with their areas and populations as estimated in 2018:

Demographics 

Nineveh Province is multiethnic. There are significant numbers of Arabs, Assyrians, Turkmens, Kurds and Yazidis who live in both in towns and cities, and in their own specific villages and regions. There are also many Armenians, Kawliya, Mandeans and Shabaks.

The majority are Sunni Muslim, with 80% of the Arabs being Sunni Muslim, as well as Turkmens and Kurds also being Sunni Muslim. About 5–10% of the population is Christian. Generally, Yazidis, Shabaks and Mandeans are followers of their respective heritage religions, Yazidism, Shabakism, and Mandaeism.

The primary spoken language is Arabic. Minority languages include Turkmen, Neo-Aramaic dialects, Kurdish (predominantly Kurmanji) and Armenian.

Proposed Assyrian autonomous region 

Many Assyrian leaders advocate an autonomous Assyrian homeland within the Nineveh Province (mostly in the Nineveh Plains region) for the Assyrian population.

See also 
 2005 Nineveh governorate election
 Nineveh Plains
 Assyrian homeland
 List of Yazidi settlements
 List of churches and monasteries in Nineveh
 Genocide of Yazidis by ISIL
 Genocide of Christians by ISIL
 Proposals for Assyrian autonomy in Iraq

Notes and references

Further reading 
 

 
Governorates of Iraq
Assyrian geography
Upper Mesopotamia
Yazidis in Iraq